Reyhanabad (also Romanized as Reyḩānābād) is a village in Kolbad-e Sharqi Rural District, Kolbad District, Galugah County, Mazandaran Province, Iran. At the 2006 census, its population was 970, in 265 families.

References 

Populated places in Galugah County